The 82-PM-41, M-41 or the 82-mm mortar Model 1941 was a Soviet 82-millimeter calibre mortar developed during the Second World War as an infantry battalion mortar, and which began production in 1941.

Design 
It differed from the Model 1937 by the presence of a removable wheel base, by the arched construction base plate (as in 107-mm and 120-mm mortars), and also a different two-legged construction. Wheels were slipped over the semi-axis of the bipod feet and removed during firing. 

Design improvements were made to reduce weight and production cost, and improve manoeuvrability. The ballistic data of the Model 1941 mortar were analogous to the Model 1937. The 82-mm mortar Model 1941 was more convenient to transport than the Model 1937, but was less steady during firing and had a worse centre of gravity. 

To correct shortcomings of the 82-mm mortar Model 1941 it was modernised during initial production; the construction of the bipod, wheel and fastening of the sight was changed. The modernised mortar was called the 82-mm mortar Model 1943.

Usage 
Due to the initial need to rectify design issues 1937 Model mortars continued to be used during World War II and produced alongside Models 1941 and 1943. As many Model 1937 Mortars were lost early in the war, this mortar served in the Battle for Moscow, Battle of Stalingrad, Battle of Kursk, and other campaigns, operations and engagements of the first three years of the war.  The German designation for captured M-41 mortars was 8.2 cm GrW 274/3(r).

Users

Citations and notes

References
 Bishop, Chris, (Ed.), The Encyclopaedia of weapons of World War II, Barnes & Noble Books, New York, 1998
 Norris, John, Infantry Mortars of World War II, Osprey Publishing, 2002
 Barker, A. J., & Walter, John, Russian Infantry Weapons of World War II, Arco Pub. Co., 1971
 Cornish, Nik, Images of Kursk: History's Greatest Tank Battle, July 1943, Brassey's, 2002

World War II infantry mortars of the Soviet Union
Cold War weapons of the Soviet Union
82 mm mortars
Weapons and ammunition introduced in 1941